Casper Dalsgaard Jacobsen (born July 12, 1979) is a Danish former footballer, who last played as a semi-professional goalkeeper for Vejle Boldklub in the Danish 1st Division.

External links 

 Danish national team profile DBU.dk

1979 births
Living people
People from Viborg Municipality
Danish men's footballers
Denmark under-21 international footballers
Casper Jacobsen
AaB Fodbold players
Aarhus Gymnastikforening players
Danish expatriates in Iceland
Viborg FF players
Vejle Boldklub players
Expatriate footballers in Iceland
Association football goalkeepers
Sportspeople from the Central Denmark Region